Bill Whatley may refer to:
 Bill Whatley (footballer)
 Bill Whatley (trade unionist)